Sharmell Sullivan-Huffman (born November 2, 1970) is an American actress and retired professional wrestling valet, dancer, beauty queen, and professional wrestler. As the wife of Booker T, she is best known for her time with World Wrestling Entertainment (WWE) as Queen Sharmell. She first came to prominence in the wrestling world as Storm, a member of the World Championship Wrestling dance troupe the Nitro Girls and she also played a character called Paisley. Sullivan-Huffman performed for Total Nonstop Action Wrestling (TNA) under the ring name Sharmell from 2007 until leaving the company in 2009.

Early life and education
Sullivan was valedictorian of Roosevelt High School in Gary, Indiana, in 1988, and graduated from Spelman College in Atlanta, Georgia in 1997 with a degree in mathematics.

Miss Black America
At age 20, Sullivan won the 1991 Miss Black America pageant (she was Miss Black Indiana), which was marred by accusations of rape by Miss Black Rhode Island, Desiree Washington, against pageant judge Mike Tyson. After winning the title, Sullivan began a career in professional dance, touring with several hip hop artists and R&B bands, including a 3½ year stint with James Brown.

Professional wrestling career

World Championship Wrestling (1999–2001)
Sullivan joined World Championship Wrestling's Nitro Girl dance troupe in December, 1998 under the name Storm. When the Nitro Girls began becoming more involved in WCW storylines, she was made the valet for The Artist, re-dubbing herself Paisley. As Paisley, she made her in-ring singles debut against Tammy Lynn Sytch on the April 26, 2000, episode of WCW Thunder, winning with a DDT. Following The Artist's release from WCW, Sullivan began valeting for Kwee Wee. She also formed an alliance with fellow former Nitro Girl Tygress, and the two ladies frequently double-teamed the Misfits In Action's valet Major Gunns.

While in WCW, Sullivan was also a part of the pop music group Diversity 5 with other Nitro Girls Fyre, Spice, Chae, and Tygress. In 2001, when she signed with the WWF, she was replaced in the group by Chiquita Anderson (also a Nitro Girl).

WWE (2001–2002; 2005–2007, 2022)
In 2001, just before WCW was bought by the World Wrestling Federation (WWF), Sullivan was released from WCW and signed a developmental contract with WWF with the intent of becoming a full-time in-ring performer and backstage interviewer. She was sent to Ohio Valley Wrestling to continue her training, and was made the valet for The Suicide Blondes, wearing a blonde wig and using the name Sister Sharmell. Her training, however, was cut short by an injury, forcing her to retire from in-ring work. In November 2001, Sullivan was called up and put in a backstage interview position on SmackDown!, which lasted until sometime in early 2002 before the company was renamed World Wrestling Entertainment. She retired from wrestling afterwards to run a clothing store in Houston, Texas.

Sullivan was re-hired by the (now renamed) World Wrestling Entertainment in the spring of 2005, debuting as a face valet for her real-life husband Booker T. Together they took part in a feud with Kurt Angle, during which Angle continually sexually harassed Sharmell. Sharmell began turning heel in October when she started interfering in Booker's matches, presumably without his knowledge. Her heel turn was cemented she helped Booker win the United States Championship from Chris Benoit on the October 21 episode of SmackDown!, which preceded a heel turn by Booker the following week when he revealed he knew of her involvement in his matches the entire time.

Sharmell and Booker T then began a feud with The Boogeyman, and during a handicap match at WrestleMania 22 The Boogeyman managed to kiss Sharmell while he had a mouth full of worms before winning the match.

After Booker T's victory in the 2006 King of the Ring tournament, Booker T began referring to himself as "King Booker" and Sharmell as "Queen Sharmell". As part of their new on-screen personas, the duo began speaking in faux British accents and acting pompous. On the April 6, 2007, episode of SmackDown! Sharmell turned on King Booker, claiming his failure to defeat Matt Hardy that night—after Hardy had nearly attacked her during WrestleMania 23—meant Booker did not care about her honor. Later that night, as part of the storyline, Booker tried to impress Sharmell by attacking World Heavyweight Champion The Undertaker which ended in Booker being hit with a Tombstone Piledriver on the announce table and sprained Booker's neck, which put him out of action. On the June 11 episode of Raw, Sharmell and King Booker were drafted from SmackDown! to Raw as part of the WWE Draft. Due to conflicts with storyline and overall character direction, in October 2007, Sharmell, along with Booker, requested and were granted their releases from their contracts by WWE. She then made an appearance at the 2013 WWE Hall Of Fame to watch her husband get inducted.
In 2021, WWE Network listed Queen Sharmell as one of the women who made an impact in WWE outside the ring. The following year, it was announced that she would be inducted into the WWE Hall of Fame.

Total Nonstop Action Wrestling (2007–2009)

At the Genesis pay per view on November 11, 2007, Sharmell debuted in TNA during the TNA World Heavyweight Championship match attacking Karen Angle.

At Final Resolution on January 6, 2008, Sharmell and Booker T were booked into a mixed tag team match against Robert Roode and Ms. Brooks and won after she rolled-up Ms. Brooks. After the match, Roode was arguing with Ms. Brooks when Sharmell came back to stop Roode only to get hit in the face and kayfabe breaking her jaw. She made her return at Destination X, after the Booker T and Roode match, whipping Payton Banks and Roode. On April 13 at Lockdown, she and husband, Booker T defeated Robert Roode and Payton Banks.

Sharmell was inactive following Booker's heel turn, but returned at Victory Road during the main event between Samoa Joe and her husband. She established herself as a heel during the match by making the three-count, allowing her husband to "win" the TNA World Heavyweight Championship. When Booker joined The Main Event Mafia in October 2008, Sharmell followed suit. On the November 20 edition of Impact!, Sharmell was challenged to a match with ODB at Final Resolution, which she accepted. Along with The Beautiful People, Sharmell fell to the team of ODB, Taylor Wilde, and Roxxi at Final Resolution. Sharmell was regularly seen bickering with fellow Mafia valet Jenna Morasca, leading to a catfight backstage on the May 28 edition of Impact! which led to Sharmell challenging Morasca to a match at Victory Road. She lost the match at Victory Road after Kong knocked her out then Morasca pinned her. She then competed in the TNA Knockout Tag Title tournament teaming with Traci Brooks to represent The Main Event Mafia, but they lost in the first round of the tournament to Awesome Kong and Raisha Saeed. At Bound for Glory Booker and Sharmell made their final appearance for TNA, before leaving the company.

Other media
During the week of November 5, 2007, she appeared on five episodes of Family Feud with Batista, Candice Michelle, Booker T, Mr. Kennedy, Layla El, Michelle McCool, Maria, Ric Flair, and Jonathan Coachman.

Personal life
Sullivan has a stepson Brandon, from Huffman's first marriage. She and Huffman began dating while they both worked for WCW. The couple were married in February 2005. Sullivan gave birth to twins, a boy and a girl, Kendrick and Kennedy, on August 5, 2010.

Championships and accomplishments

Beauty pageant
Miss Black America
Miss Black America (1991)

Professional wrestling
Wrestling Observer Newsletter
Worst Worked Match of the Year (2009) vs. Jenna Morasca at Victory Road
WWE
WWE Hall of Fame (Class of 2022)

References

External links

BookerT Online (Booker T's Official Site)

 

1970 births
20th-century African-American sportspeople
20th-century African-American women
20th-century African-American people
21st-century African-American sportspeople
21st-century African-American women
21st-century professional wrestlers
American female professional wrestlers
African-American beauty pageant winners
African-American female professional wrestlers
Living people
Professional wrestling dancers
Professional wrestlers from Indiana
Professional wrestling managers and valets
Miss Black America delegates
Sportspeople from Gary, Indiana
Dancers from Indiana
WWE Hall of Fame inductees